David Lowell Gibson (born October 1, 1946) is an American country music songwriter. Gibson has written songs for Alabama, Tanya Tucker, and others.

Gibson was born in El Dorado, Arkansas and raised in Odessa, Texas before moving to Nashville, Tennessee in 1982.

He held a publishing contract with a company owned by The Oak Ridge Boys. Between 1990 and 1994, Gibson was the frontman of the Gibson/Miller Band. Gibson was married to singer-songwriter Daisy Dern.

List of songs written by Dave Gibson
Gibson wrote or co-wrote the following songs:

Alabama: "Jukebox in My Mind"
Larry Boone: "Don't Give Candy to a Stranger"
Confederate Railroad: "Queen of Memphis", "Daddy Never Was the Cadillac Kind"
Joe Diffie: "Ships That Don't Come In"
Gibson/Miller Band: "High Rollin'", "Texas Tattoo", "Red, White, and Blue Collar", "Stone Cold Country"
James House: "That'll Be the Last Thing"
Montgomery Gentry: "Lonely and Gone"
Southern Pacific: "Honey I Dare You", "All Is Lost"
Pam Tillis: "Do You Know Where Your Man Is"
Tanya Tucker: "If It Don't Come Easy"
Conway Twitty: "House on Old Lonesome Road"
Steve Wariner: "Midnight Fire", "Don't You Give Up on Love", "Heart Trouble"

References

1946 births
American country singer-songwriters
Country musicians from Arkansas
Living people
People from Union County, Arkansas
Singer-songwriters from Arkansas